Tomares is a municipality in Andalusia, southern Spain. It is a Seville suburb of over 25,000 inhabitants situated two kilometers west of Triana District of Seville, separated from the city by River Guadalquivir. It is surrounded by other municipalities of the Comarca of Aljarafe, whose boundaries are reduced to a single street, forming a conurbation.

Roman hoard
In 2016 construction workers uncovered a  hoard of ancient Roman coins in Zaudin Park. The bronze coins were stored in 19 amphoras while newly minted, and are stamped with inscriptions of emperors Maximian and Constantine. Some were originally coated in silver.

References

Municipalities of the Province of Seville